Lissotriton is a genus of newts native to Europe and parts of Asia Minor. As most other newts, they are aquatic as larvae and during breeding time but live in terrestrial, humid environments over the rest of the season.

These rather small species used to be included in genus Triturus, but phylogenetic analyses demonstrated that genus as paraphyletic. In the following, the name Lissotriton, originally introduced by Thomas Bell in 1839, was reinstated for the small-bodied species related to the type species Lissotriton vulgaris (the smooth newt).

Their exact phylogenetic placement within the newts (subfamily Pleurodelinae) is still uncertain.

Species
Currently, ten species are listed in Amphibian Species of the World – the rank of some of these as species or subspecies is however controversial:
Lissotriton boscai (Lataste, 1879) – Bosca's newt
Lissotriton graecus (Wolterstorff, 1906) – Greek newt
Lissotriton helveticus (Razoumovsky, 1789) – Palmate newt
Lissotriton italicus (Peracca, 1898) – Italian newt
Lissotriton kosswigi (Freytag, 1955)
Lissotriton lantzi (Wolterstorff, 1914) – Caucasian smooth newt
Lissotriton maltzani (Boettger, 1879)
Lissotriton montandoni (Boulenger, 1880) – Carpathian newt
Lissotriton schmidtleri (Raxworthy, 1988)
Lissotriton vulgaris (Linnaeus, 1758) – Smooth newt

Gallery

Mate selection

Female mate choice is an important concept in evolutionary biology because it bears on female and male reproductive success.  Experiments were carried out with Lissotriton vulgaris in which female newts were paired sequentially with two males having different degrees of genetic relatedness to the female.  It was found that the more genetically dissimilar male had a higher paternity share than the less related male.  Female choice may reflect an avoidance of inbreeding with related males that could lead to less fit progeny (inbreeding depression).

References

External links

 
Taxa named by Thomas Bell (zoologist)
Amphibian genera